Bucculatrix luteella is a moth in the family Bucculatricidae. It was described in 1873 by Vactor Tousey Chambers. It is found in North America, where it has been recorded from Kentucky, Ohio, Iowa, Maine, New Jersey, Pennsylvania, Washington D.C., North Carolina and South Carolina.

The wingspan is 5–6 mm. The forewings are creamy white or pale yellow, shading to pale orange in the middle of the wing. The hindwings vary from yellowish white in some females to pale fuscous in males. Adults have been recorded on wing from May to September.

The larvae feed on Quercus alba and Quercus macrocarpa.

References

Natural History Museum Lepidoptera generic names catalog

Bucculatricidae
Moths described in 1873
Moths of North America